Martin Hristov (born 6 December 1980) is a Bulgarian former football winger. Hristov's first club was Cherno More Varna.

References

Bulgarian footballers
1980 births
Living people
Association football midfielders
First Professional Football League (Bulgaria) players
PFC Cherno More Varna players
PFC Svetkavitsa players
PFC Slavia Sofia players
PFC Vidima-Rakovski Sevlievo players
FC Chernomorets Balchik players